United Nations Security Council resolution 805, adopted unanimously on 4 February 1993, after noting the death of International Court of Justice (ICJ) judge Manfred Lachs on 14 January 1993, the Council decided that elections to the vacancy on the ICJ would take place on 10 May 1993 at the Security Council and at a meeting of the General Assembly during its 47th session.

Lachs was a member of the court since 1967, and was its president between 1973 and 1976. His term of office was due to expire in February 1994.

See also
 Judges of the International Court of Justice
 List of United Nations Security Council Resolutions 801 to 900 (1993–1994)

References

External links
 
Text of the Resolution at undocs.org

 0805
 0805
February 1993 events